Fort Vengeance (aka Royal Mounted Police) is a 1953 American Western film directed by Lesley Selander and starring James Craig, Rita Moreno and Keith Larsen.

Plot
Two North Dakota brothers (James Craig, Keith Larsen) flee to Canada and join the Mounties during an Indian dispute.

Cast

 James Craig as Dick Ross 
 Rita Moreno as Bridget Fitzgibbon 
 Keith Larsen as Carey Ross 
 Reginald Denny as Inspector Trevett
 Charles Irwin as Sgt. Saxon 
 Morris Ankrum as Chief Blackfoot 
 Guy Kingsford as Sgt. Major MacRea 
 Michael Granger as Sitting Bull
 Patrick Whyte as Sgt. Major Harmington
 Paul Marion as Eagle Heart
 Emory Parnell as Patrick Fitzgibbon

References

External links

1953 films
1950s English-language films
1953 Western (genre) films
Films based on short fiction
Films set in Canada
Royal Canadian Mounted Police in fiction
Cinecolor films
Films directed by Lesley Selander
Allied Artists films
American Western (genre) films
Films produced by Walter Wanger
Films scored by Paul Dunlap
1950s American films